Dr. G: Medical Examiner is a reality television series that originally aired on Discovery Health Channel and Discovery Fit & Health. Dr. G, or Dr. Jan Garavaglia, was the Chief Medical Examiner with Florida's District Nine Medical Examiner's office in Orlando, Florida.

This series features Dr. G working on unexplained deaths in Orange and Osceola counties in Florida, as well as similar deaths from her previous employment as an Associate Medical Examiner in Bexar County, Texas. The show features dramatic re-enactments of the events leading up to the person's death as well as the autopsies. Interviews with Dr. G, family members, and other people connected to the deaths are also shown.

Dr. G also hosted a five-episode spinoff series titled Dr. G: America's Most Shocking Cases, in which she takes viewers out of her own morgue and profiles some of history's most baffling forensic mysteries. The spinoff aired from October 2009 to April 2010 on Discovery Health Channel and was narrated by Jon Prevatt.

After a high-profile career, Dr. G went into retirement in 2015.

Dr. G: Medical Examiner and its spinoff were produced by NY-based Atlas Media Corporation, with Executive Producer Bruce David Klein.

Synopsis 
The unexplained deaths that Dr. G investigates can be attributed to various causes, such as undiagnosed medical conditions, accidents, or foul play. In one instance, a woman who attempted suicide died a few days after her attempt. Dr. G found that her death was actually due to another condition and was not by her own hand. Another instance dealt with human bones that had been found alongside railroad tracks. Through an autopsy and investigative work it was discovered that the remains were those of a missing girl who had been killed by her mother.

Episodes
Dr. G: Medical Examiner premiered on July 23, 2004, and its final episode aired on February 10, 2012, for a total of 88 episodes and 2 specials.

Season 1 (2004–05)

Season 2 (2005–06)

Season 3 (2006–07)

Season 4 (2007–08)

Season 5 (2008–09)

Season 6 (2009–10)

Season 7 (2010)

Season 8 (2011–12)

Specials

Dr. G: America's Most Shocking Cases

Syndication
TLC and FitTV began re-airing episodes in 2008. Following the replacement of the Discovery Health Channel with OWN: The Oprah Winfrey Network in 2011, new episodes began airing on Discovery Fit & Health. The last episode aired in February 2012. Reruns currently air on the Justice Network.

, all episodes of the series, Dr. G: America's Most Shocking Cases and its specials are made available for streaming online on The Roku Channel, Pluto TV, Tubi, Crackle (three seasons only), Peacock, Vudu, Amazon Freevee and  YouTube, via FilmRise.

Home media releases
On October 27, 2009, Echo Bridge Home Entertainment released the first season of Dr. G: Medical Examiner on DVD in Region 1.

Publications
On October 14, 2008, Dr. G released her first book, How Not to Die: Surprising Lessons on Living Longer, Safer and Healthier from America's Favorite Medical Examiner. Using cases from her 20 years of experience as a medical examiner, Dr. G identifies some of the key lifestyle and behavioral choices that can result in early death. She also offers advice on how to be smart and proactive about one's health. A television special titled "How Not to Die: A Dr. G Special" aired on Discovery Health Channel on the same day the book was released.

References

External links
 
 How Not to Die official site
 Exclusive Interview With Dr. G
 

2004 American television series debuts
2012 American television series endings
2000s American reality television series
2010s American reality television series
G, Dr.
Discovery Health Channel original programming
Television shows about death
True crime television series